Puigsacalm is the highest mountain of the Catalan Transversal Range, Catalonia, Spain. It has an elevation of 1,512 metres above sea level.

See also
Catalan Transversal Range
Mountains of Catalonia

References

Mountains of Catalonia
Emblematic summits of Catalonia